The 2013 Los Angeles mayoral election was held on March 5, 2013, to elect the mayor of Los Angeles. No candidate received a majority of the primary votes to be elected outright, and the top two finishers, Eric Garcetti and Wendy Greuel advanced to a runoff vote. On May 21, 2013, Garcetti was elected mayor with a majority of the votes in the runoff.

Municipal elections in California are officially non-partisan but candidates receive support and endorsements from their respective parties or affiliated organizations. The Los Angeles County Republican Party endorsed Kevin James, the lone Republican in the field, while the Los Angeles County Democratic Party supported the candidacies of Garcetti, Greuel, Perry and Pleitez without making an endorsement.

Incumbent mayor Antonio Villaraigosa was ineligible to run because of term limits.

General election

Candidates

Declared
 Yehuda "YJ" Draiman, businessman, member of the Northridge East Neighborhood Council, and father of David Draiman.
 Eric Garcetti, City Councilman for the 13th district and former City Council President (Voter registration: Democratic)
 Wendy Greuel, city controller and former city councilwoman for the 2nd district (Voter registration: Democratic)
 Kevin James, talk radio host and attorney (Voter registration: Republican)
 Addie M. Miller, citywide advocate
 Jan Perry, city councilwoman for the 9th district (Voter registration: Democratic)
 Emanuel Pleitez, chief strategy officer at Spokeo and former Villaraigosa aide (Voter registration: Democratic)
 Norton Sandler, factory worker (Voter registration: Socialist Workers Party)

Withdrew
 Austin Beutner, Los Angeles Times publisher, former deputy mayor and former investment banker

Declined
 Rick J. Caruso, mall developer (Voter registration: Republican)
 Alex Padilla, state Senator for the 20th district (Voter registration: Democratic)
 Zev Yaroslavsky, County Supervisor for the 3rd district (Voter registration: Democratic)

Issues
Articles in the Los Angeles Times and Los Angeles Daily News suggested that the fiscal state of Los Angeles would likely play a major role in the election. Also a question was the role that Villaraigosa's popularity will play; in 2009 his support was seen as more of a liability than an asset.

Polling
Graphical summary

Results

Runoff

Polling
Graphical summary

Results

References

Jason Kandel 8 Vie for Los Angeles Mayor in Upcoming City Primary
http://www.nbclosangeles.com/news/local/8-Vie-for-Los-Angeles-Mayor-193402421.html

External links
 YJ Draiman for Mayor
 Eric Garcetti for Mayor 
 Wendy Greuel for Mayor
 Kevin James for Mayor
 Addie Miller for Mayor
 Jan Perry for Mayor
 Emanuel Pleitez for Mayor

Mayoral election, 2013
2013 California elections
Eric Garcetti
2013
Los Angeles